Lee is a town in Penobscot County, Maine, United States. It was incorporated in 1832.  The community was named for Stephen Lee, an early settler. The population was 916 at the 2020 census. Lee has been home to Lee Academy since 1845.

Geography

Demographics

2010 census
As of the census of 2010, there were 922 people, 356 households, and 262 families living in the town. The racial makeup of the town was 89.9% White, 1.8% African American, 0.8% Native American, 6.2% Asian, 0.2% from other races, and 1.1% from two or more races. Hispanic or Latino of any race were 0.8% of the population.

There were 356 households, of which 28.7% had children under the age of 18 living with them, 59.6% were married couples living together, 7.9% had a female householder with no husband present, 6.2% had a male householder with no wife present, and 26.4% were non-families. 21.1% of all households were made up of individuals, and 11.3% had someone living alone who was 65 years of age or older. The average household size was 2.37 and the average family size was 2.65.

The median age in the town was 45.9 years. 21.1% of residents were under the age of 18; 12% were between the ages of 18 and 24; 15.6% were from 25 to 44; 34.1% were from 45 to 64; and 17.2% were 65 years of age or older. The gender makeup of the town was 52.3% male and 47.7% female.

2000 census
As of the census of 2000, there were 845 people, 298 households, and 247 families living in the town.  The population density was 21.9 people per square mile (8.5/km2).  There were 463 housing units at an average density of 12.0 per square mile (4.6/km2).  The racial makeup of the town was 98.82% White, 0.12% Native American, 0.12% Asian, and 0.95% from two or more races. Hispanic or Latino of any race were 0.12% of the population.

There were 298 households, out of which 39.3% had children under the age of 18 living with them, 73.5% were married couples living together, 6.4% had a female householder with no husband present, and 16.8% were non-families. 12.8% of all households were made up of individuals, and 6.7% had someone living alone who was 65 years of age or older.  The average household size was 2.81 and the average family size was 3.03.

In the town, the population was spread out, with 27.9% under the age of 18, 5.2% from 18 to 24, 32.3% from 25 to 44, 20.0% from 45 to 64, and 14.6% who were 65 years of age or older.  The median age was 38 years. For every 100 females, there were 105.1 males.  For every 100 females age 18 and over, there were 102.3 males.

The median income for a household in the town was $34,519, and the median income for a family was $35,813. Males had a median income of $33,214 versus $23,462 for females. The per capita income for the town was $16,857.  About 8.8% of families and 12.5% of the population were below the poverty line, including 14.3% of those under age 18 and 21.7% of those age 65 or over.

Notable people
 Everett McLeod, Maine State Representative
 King G. Staples, Wisconsin State Assemblyman

References

External links
Town of Lee official website

Towns in Penobscot County, Maine
Towns in Maine